Uwe Eisenreich (born 12 July 1958) is a German bobsledder. He competed at the 1984 Winter Olympics and the 1988 Winter Olympics.

References

External links
 

1958 births
Living people
German male bobsledders
Olympic bobsledders of West Germany
Bobsledders at the 1984 Winter Olympics
Bobsledders at the 1988 Winter Olympics
People from Friedberg, Hesse
Sportspeople from Darmstadt (region)